Grete Anni Berget (25 March 1954 – 9 November 2017) was a Norwegian politician for the Labour Party. She was born in Vinstra, Nord-Fron, Oppland, and worked as a journalist in her early career. Berget was private advisor to the Prime Minister 1990 – 1991, and Minister of Children and Family Affairs 1991 – 1996. From 2003 she was secretary general of the Norwegian European Movement. Berget died from cancer on 9 November 2017.

References

1954 births
2017 deaths
People from Nord-Fron
Labour Party (Norway) politicians
Ministers of Children, Equality and Social Inclusion of Norway
Ministers for children, young people and families
Women government ministers of Norway